John D. Coffino is an American and international basketball coach, athletic mentor, and scout. He has coached in the NBA, G-League, FIBA, Europe, Asia, Africa, Middle East, NCAA Div I & NCAA Div II, the ABA, ABL other leagues, and high school. After a long tenure coaching overseas, in 2018 Coach Coffino returned home and most recently has been a head coach at multiple post-graduate sports academies at IMG Academy,  a 4A academy in Florida,  and FCP Coastal Prep Sports Academy . He brings that vital experience of coaching, player development, and college placement of players with him as he builds the Prestige Worldwide Sports Academy Basketball Program.  In addition to coaching and recruiting, Coffino also trains and certifies coaches and runs grassroots youth programs. Every summer, Coffino works overseas and at U.S. basketball camps in Los Angeles, Las Vegas, Florida, Massachusetts, and New York.

Coffino speaks several languages and is active on social media.

Biography

John D. Coffino was born November 7, 1962, in New York City and raised in the Bronx. He is an American and international basketball players' coach, scout, and athletic mentor whose career started in 1992 and he has coached at all levels from Associate Head Coach at Westchester Community College to NBA D-League head coach. In 2011, Coach Coffino started his overseas coaching from Qatar and continues to several countries including Spain, China, Kenya, the Republic of Georgia, the United Kingdom, the Republic of the Maldives, and Denmark. He gained a nationwide reputation for his ability to identify outstanding talents and effectively recruit both high school and junior college players. Coach Coffino has extensive recruiting contacts in the New York/NJ area and all of the East Coast that stretches across the United States to the West Coast as well as internationally. Coffino has also been a West Coast scout for the NBA with Clibhoops.net Draft Services.

Coffino, a graduate of St. Peter's College in Jersey City, began his coaching career at Westchester Community College  (1992–97) in Valhalla, New York, where he guided the Vikings to the National Junior College Athletic Association DI Tourney in 1993. While coaching at St. Peter's, Coffino and Wagner, head coach Mike Deane were NCAA Tournament analysts on The Wally and the Keeg Show on 1050 ESPN Radio in New York City.

In April 2012, Coffino was named the head coach of the Albany Legends of the Independent Basketball Association (IBA) where he steered them to the IBA championship game. Coffino came to the Legends from the Qatar Sports Club, the State of Qatar in the Middle East, where he was a head coach. Before Qatar Sports Club, Coffino was the head coach for the Albuquerque Thunderbirds ('08-'10) of the NBA Development League where he coached Alando Tucker, D. J. Strawberry (Phoenix Suns), Carlos Powell (NBA player), Kevin Pittsnogle, Keith McLeod (NBA) and Antoine Agudio. Coffino was originally asked to join the Thunderbirds by then head coach Jeff Ruland as an assistant coach. It was a reuniting; Ruland and Coffino were former head and assistant coaches, respectively, for some very good Iona College teams in late 1990s. 

From 2010 to the present, Coffino has run and worked several Basketball and Day camps all over the U.S. and internationally and has been a guest speaker at several Basketball Clinics. In 2011-2012, Coffino worked as an Analyst at Aljazeera's Sports Show and EuroBasket Academy. Coach Coffino is a frequent guest on different sports programs and podcasts like, MPV cast, Never Follow Trends Podcast, The Mindset Athlete, FBBL360's show., Never Follow Trends Podcast, The Mindset Athlete, FBBL360's show.

International Coaching 

Coach Coffino’s international experience started in 2011 as a Head Coach of Qatar Sports Club. 
After a year of successful coaching in  Qatar, Coach Coffino returned to the US, before deciding in August 2013 to continue his overseas coaching journey with Dankind Academy  in Nairobi as a Head Coach and a Director of Basketball Operations. During that time his team won the NBA championship. 

Right after the Dankind Academy in June 2014, Coach Coffino became the Head Coach of British Basketball League side Cheshire Phoenix, some notable names from the NBA who worked with Coffino endorsed the move. “Congratulations to the Cheshire Phoenix! Not only have you hired a great coach and teacher but also a person of high character and integrity. Coach Coffino will not be outworked,” said Mitch Kupchak, General Manager of the Los Angeles Lakers Bob Hill, former coach of the New York Knicks, Indiana Pacers, San Antonio Spurs, and the Seattle Supersonics said: “The Cheshire Phoenix have hired a terrific person as well as an outstanding coach! Congratulations on an excellent hire!” And Jeff Ruland, NBA All Star and former coach at the Philadelphia 76ers stated, “I have known John for over 20 years. He is a tireless worker and has great people skills. Cheshire is very lucky to have him.” But for Coach Coffino, the focus is on the future and how he can help Phoenix achieve success on and off the court. Coffino was awarded the Molten BBL Coach of the Month award for December 2014 after having led the Phoenix on an eight-game winning streak during the month. Coffino is the best coach Cheshire has had in the last decade.

In the summer of 2015, Coffino was appointed as the head coach of BC Sukhumi of the Georgian Superliga. After already coaching the 2015 edition of the Scorers 1st Showcase, Coffino returned there in the 2016 edition of the event and served as the Head-Coach for Team E in July. From 1 July 2017 to August 2017 Coffino was a head coach at Europrobasketball Academy. The same year, November 2015, Coffino was offered the position of Director of Player Development and a head coach, Boys Basketball Program in QSI International School of Tbilisi. The High School Boys basketball team coached by Coffino won 1st place in the Basketball Classics Tournament on Feb 2015, 2016, 2017,2018 hosted by QSI Tbilisi and International School of Kiev, Ukraine. 

From September 2017 to May 2018,  Coach Coffino was Supervisor of Basketball Coaches, Zaza Pachulia Basketball Academy in Tbilisi, Georgia. From May 2018 until December 2018, Coffino was the head basketball coach for the men's senior national team for the Republic of the Maldives. He guided his team to the gold round of the regional tournament in Bangladesh.  In June 2019, he signed a contract with the Vejen Basketball Klub in Denmark. Coach Coffino managed to guide the club that was at the bottom of the league to one of the most respectful teams in Denmark. In October 2019 he moved back to Florida, U.S., where he coaches and recruits for several sports academies.

Career Timeline

Games Coached

Camps

References

Living people
Albuquerque Thunderbirds coaches
Basketball coaches from New York (state)
Iona Gaels men's basketball coaches
Junior college men's basketball coaches in the United States
Niagara Purple Eagles men's basketball coaches
Place of birth missing (living people)
Saint Peter's Peacocks men's basketball coaches
Saint Peter's University alumni
1962 births